USS James M. Gilliss may refer to one of the following United States Navy ships:

  (also AGS-13, AGSC-13, MHC-13), laid down as YMS-262; renamed 23 March 1945; struck and sold, 1960
 , an oceanographic research ship launched 1962; sold to Mexico as Altair (H-05) in 1996

United States Navy ship names